Kline is an unincorporated community on the Southern Ute Indian Reservation in La Plata County, Colorado, United States. ZIP code 81326 serves Kline, but mail must be addressed to Hesperus.

Geography
Kline is located at  (37.1441668,-108.1195189).

See also

References

External links

Unincorporated communities in La Plata County, Colorado
Unincorporated communities in Colorado